The Psychiatric Clinic in Prague is the oldest psychiatric hospital in the Czech Republic. Part of Prague's General Faculty Hospital, the clinic has five inpatient wards and also provides integrated day treatment. An expansion in 2000 added a day care centre for adolescents. The clinic's hot line, established in 1964, was the first of its kind in Europe.

Notable physicians
 Benjamin Čumpelík
 Jan Dobiáš
 Antonín Heveroch
 Jan Janský
 František Köstel
 Karel Kuffner
 Jan Mečíř
 Zdeněk Mysliveček
 Jiří Raboch
 Jaroslav Skála
 Vladimír Vondráček
 Petr Zvolský

References

External links 
Official website

Psychiatric hospitals in the Czech Republic
Hospitals in Prague
Hospitals established in the 1780s